Walang Iwanan is a 2015 Philippine family drama television series directed by Jerome Chavez Pobocan, starring child stars Louise Abuel, Raikko Mateo, Micko Laurente, John Michael and Karla Cruz, together with Roxanne Guinoo, Jhong Hilario, John Estrada and Beauty Gonzalez in their supporting roles. The series premiered on ABS-CBN's Kapamilya Gold afternoon block and worldwide on The Filipino Channel from October 19, 2015 to December 4, 2015, replacing Nasaan Ka Nang Kailangan Kita. and was replaced by And I Love You So.

The series is streaming online on YouTube.

Plot
Jose Bautista (Louise Abuel) grew away from his mother, father and siblings. He lived with his two grandmothers, Lola Ina and Lola Ebe. Jose didn't know the truth behind his identity that he was the son of Anita (Roxanne Guinoo) with another man, Roel (Joem Bascon). But due to the simple dream of Anita's whole family to have a child, she chose to marry Kamlon (Jhong Hilario) who promised Anita he will treat Jose like his real child. But Kamlon does not fulfill that promise and denies Jose. Because of their desperation to correct the mistakes, Ebe and Ina raised Jose with them.

Jose grew happy, obedient, and respectful. He never once questioned his separation from his family but he still longed to be with them one day too. Jose was satisfied and happy with his grandmothers until both of them died. Jose moves to his family's home and because of the lessons taught by them, he has to learned to be positive in life and live with the family he has not met. Anita has introduced Jose to his siblings, Boy (Micko Laurente), Maribel (Karla Cruz), Crisencio (Jon Michael) and Michael (Raikko Mateo), they are equally uncomfortable with him. It was hard to get close to them because Boy hated him.

Cast and characters

Main cast
 Louise Abuel as Jose Bautista
 Micko Laurente as Boy Bautista
 Raikko Mateo as Michael Bautista
 Jon Michael as Crisencio Bautista
 Karla Cruz as Maribel Bautista

Supporting cast
 Roxanne Guinoo as Anita Bautista
 Jhong Hilario as Kamlon Bautista
 John Estrada as Diosdado "Dado" Pascual
 Beauty Gonzalez as Jane Bautista
 Alex Castro as Father Chito
 Nicco Manalo as Sarge
 Yda Yaneza as Lola Maring
 Crispin Pineda as Lolo Pido
 Jeff Luna as Elmer Cortes
 Marcus Cabrera as Mark
 Karen Reyes as Rose
 Wacky Macky as Gemma

Special participation
 Boots Anson-Roa as Lola Ina
 Ces Quesada as Lola Ebe
 JC Santos as Ricky

Guest
 Irma Adlawan as Lydia Trinidad-Gonzales
 Joem Bascon as Roel
 Shey Bustamante as Grace
 Ramon Christopher as Tisoy
 Dionne Monsanto
 Smokey Manaloto
 Marnie Lapuz

Reception

See also
 List of telenovelas of ABS-CBN

References

ABS-CBN drama series
2015 Philippine television series debuts
2015 Philippine television series endings
2010s children's television series
Filipino-language television shows
Television shows set in the Philippines